CJCD-FM (100.1 FM, 100.1 True North FM) is a radio station in Yellowknife, Northwest Territories. Owned by Vista Radio, it broadcasts a classic hits format as serving Yellowknife and Dettah.

The station also has a rebroadcaster, CJCD-FM-1 at 100.1 FM, in Hay River.

History

Prior to moving to its current FM frequency in 1997, CJCD operated at AM 1240.  CJCD-AM began broadcasting on November 13, 1979. On October 9, 1985, the station was granted a power increase from 1,000 to 4,000 watts. In September of the following year, a repeater in Hay River at 100.1 FM began operating.  The change to FM was approved in January 1997.

The station was founded by Charles Dent, Derek Squirell and Reg James. The station was sold to the Vista Broadcast Group in 2007.

On May 21, 2014, CJCD rebranded under Vista's standardized "Moose" brand as 100.1 The Moose, maintaining its existing adult hits format. On November 13, 2019, CJCD celebrated its 40th anniversary on the air.

On December 3, 2020, the station flipped to classic hits as 100.1 True North FM. The rebranding was intended to be "more representative of the culture of the area", while the station introduced new human-interest segments throughout the day known as "True North Tales" to highlight the community.

Translator
In addition to the main station, CJCD-FM is relayed by an FM translator to widen its broadcast area.

References

External links
 
 CJCD-FM history - Canadian Communications Foundation
 

JCD-FM
Radio stations established in 1998
JCD-FM
JCD-FM
JCD-FM